Elgin—Middlesex—London is a provincial electoral district in southwestern Ontario, Canada. It elects one member to the Legislative Assembly of Ontario.

It was created in 1999 from all of Elgin and parts of Middlesex and London South.

When the riding was created, it included all of Elgin County plus the townships of Delaware and North Dorchester, and that part of London south of a line following Dingman Creek to Southdale Road to White Oak Road to Exeter Road to Meg Drive to Jalna Boulevard to Ernest Avenue to Bradley Avenue to the Wenige Expressway to Arran Place to Bradley Avenue.

In 2007, it lost Delaware Township but gained all of Thames Centre.

Members

Election results

2007 electoral reform referendum

Sources

Elections Ontario Past Election Results
Map of riding for 2018 election

Ontario provincial electoral districts
Politics of London, Ontario
St. Thomas, Ontario